An art group or artist group, sometimes also an artist collective, describes itself as an open or fixed association of artists to a group with a name. Founders and initiators of artist groups are mostly well-known artists, around whom similarly thinking artists are grouped. Many groups of artists had and still have a major and significant influence on the various epochs of art history. In a broader sense, literary groups and group formations of musicians can also be referred to as artist groups.

Description
The aim of the artistic initiatives was and still is to get in touch with other artists, to point out avant-garde or newly defined efforts in art in the broadest sense, to break away from traditional, academic approaches altogether, to break new ground and to follow them for example by organizing joint exhibitions. The boundaries between all areas of fine and applied art are fluid.

In contrast to the mostly programmatically oriented artist groups, only the costs for the use of common workspaces or artist ateliers are usually shared in studio communities. Due to long-standing friendships, thematic joint exhibitions and the inevitable examination of the work of the other members, however, mixed forms can form that go beyond the pure community of convenience.

Between Artist Duo and Artists' Colony
The transition from artist group to artist colony is also fluid. One speaks of the latter when it comes to large-scale settlements of artists of the same direction. Examples of this are the Nazarene movement in Rome, the Barbizon school or the artists' colony in Worpswede. The decisive factor here is the personal decision of the individual to align their place of residence with that of like-minded artists, which can be conducive to the optimal further development of the respective art movement.

The opposite extreme of an artist group is the artist duo – the smallest, but also the most symbiotic form. Often there are real-life partnerships (as with Niki de Saint Phalle and Jean Tinguely, or also with Gilbert & George). It is not uncommon for larger groups of artists to emerge from the "nucleus" of a duo, such as the Pre-Raphaelite Brotherhood, for example, developed from the founding duo John Everett Millais and William Holman Hunt.

Criteria for the term "art group"
Designations such as "The Tachists" or Junge Wilde (The Young Wild Ones) cannot be assigned to any real groups of artists; they merely indicate common stylistic features within an epoch. A clear indication of the actual existence of such a group is a written memorandum such as that published in André Breton's Surrealist Manifesto in Paris in 1924 and signed by several like-minded artists. As a result, the members of such a group committed themselves to subordinate themselves to a common goal. This also included the group exhibitions, to which everyone should contribute their part instead of just showing themselves.

See also
 Art association
 Artist cooperative 
 Artist collective
 Art colony 
 Art movements

Artist groups and collectives